Kristine Poghosyan (born 27 September 1982) is a politician and member of the National Assembly of Armenia for the Civil Contract.

Early life and education 
Kristine Poghosyan was born in Ptghni, Kotayk Province, Soviet Armenia on 27 September 1982. She studied Cybernetics at the National Polytechnic University of Armenia and graduated in 2003. She followed up on her studies and obtained a second degree from the same university in Humanitarian and Economic Management in 2007.

Professional career 
Her professional career began in the Human Resources department of the Yerevan Brandy Company, of which she was the director between 2005 and 2007. In 2007 she transferred to the Imex Group for which she was also responsible for the Human Resources until 2010. In 2013 she was involved in the founding of the jewelry company Tre Gufo for which she acted as its director until 2018.

Political career  
In May 2018 she assumed a position as an assistant for the First Deputy Prime Minister. She resigned in January 2019 after she was elected to the National Assembly of Armenia in the Parliamentary elections of December 2018 representing the Civil Contract. She is a supporter of the LGTB community of Armenia and also the improvement of the inter-parliamentarian cooperation between the parliaments of Nagorno Karabakh and Armenia.

Personal life 
Kristine Poghosyan is married and has three children.

References 

1982 births
21st-century Armenian women politicians
21st-century Armenian politicians
Living people
People from Kotayk Province